The Asunción arch is a basement high in Paraguay and nearby areas of Argentina that makes up the modern western boundary of Paraná Basin. Asunción arch is thought to be a forebulge developed as result of the piling up of material in Bolivia and the Argentine Northwest during the Andean orogeny in the Cenozoic Era.

Along Paraguay Asunción arch has a north–south direction parallel to Paraguay River. To the south of Paraguay Asunción arch runs in a S-SW direction and be traced no further south than to Corrientes Province. A flatter and broader second branch of the Asunción arch runs from southern Paraguay the SE linking up with Río Grande arch in Brazil.

References

Basement highs
Geology of Argentina
Geology of Paraguay
Paraná Basin